Lisbellaw is a village in County Fermanagh, Northern Ireland, about  east of Enniskillen. In 2008 it had an estimated population of 1,277 people.

The village is built around the Church of Ireland parish church, which was built in the 18th century. The steep main street houses two grocery shop, a hairdressing salon, two pubs, a post office, a dentist's surgery, a beauty salon, a butcher, two mechanics, a pharmacy, a health store distributor, a chip shop, and a hardware store, as well as the Church of Ireland parish centre, the Methodist and Presbyterian churches. The Roman Catholic church building and a Plymouth Brethren gospel hall lie just off the main street. Just outside the village is Carrybridge, a marina on Upper Lough Erne.

Lisbellaw railway station opened on 16 August 1858 and shut down on 1 October 1957.

Population

2001 Census
Lisbellaw is classified as a village by the Northern Ireland Statistics and Research Agency. A census performed on 29 April 2001 revealed a population of 1,046 people living in Lisbellaw. Of these:
 24.0% were aged under 16 years and 16.7% were aged 60 and over
 48.7% of the population were male and 51.3% were female
 91.9% were from a Protestant and other Christian background (including Christian related community background) 
 7.3% of the population were from a Catholic Community Background 
 5.7% of people aged 16–74 were unemployed

2011 Census
On Census Day (27 March 2011) the usually resident population of Lisbellaw Settlement was 1,106 accounting for 0.06% of the NI total.
 99.64% were from the white (including Irish Traveller) ethnic group;
 13.47% belong to or were brought up in the Catholic religion and 83.00% belong to or were brought up in a 'Protestant and Other Christian (including Christian related)' religion; and
 72.42% indicated that they had a British national identity, 10.85% had an Irish national identity and 26.13% had a Northern Irish national identity. Respondents could indicate more than one national identity.
 3.90% had some knowledge of Irish;
 7.03% had some knowledge of Ulster-Scots; and
 0.38% did not have English as their first language.

See also 
 Market Houses in Northern Ireland

References

External links 
 Enniskillen.com
 Culture Northern Ireland

Villages in County Fermanagh